Nico Bettge (born 15 May 1980) is a German slalom canoeist who has competed in C1 since the 1997. Since 2014 he has also competed in C2 together with David Schröder.

Bettge won seven medals at the ICF Canoe Slalom World Championships with a gold (C1 team: 2006) and six silvers (C1: 2011; C1 team: 1999, 2005, 2007, 2011, 2015).

He is the overall World Cup champion in the C1 class from 2007. He also won 13 medals at the European Championships (3 golds, 5 silvers and 5 bronzes).

World Cup individual podiums

1 Pan American Championship counting for World Cup points

References

External links

German male canoeists
Living people
1980 births
Medalists at the ICF Canoe Slalom World Championships